Istinjon is a deserted Turkish Cypriot village in the Paphos District of Cyprus, located 5 km south of Lysos. Most of its inhabitants fled during an attack and siege by Turkish forces that began on 25 July 1974. The village remains a ghost village in ruins.

References

Communities in Paphos District